The following is a page of the highest-grossing Christmas-themed films.

Highest-grossing Christmas films

Highest grossing Christmas film series and franchises 

The following is a list of highest grossing Christmas film series and franchises. The Santa Clause tops the list with $470.1 million and also has the best average with $156.8 million.

Biggest worldwide openings for Christmas films

This list charts the largest opens for Christmas  films worldwide. Since Christmas  films do not open on Fridays in many markets, the 'opening' is taken to be the gross between the first day of release and the first Sunday.

Figures are given in United States dollars (USD).

This list does not take into account country-by-country variations in release dates. Therefore, in some cases opening weekend grosses from many, or even most countries may not be included.

See also
 Lists of highest-grossing films
 List of Christmas films
 Santa Claus in film

References

Christmas
Christmas films